The  Syro-Malabar Catholic Eparchy of Belthangady is an Eastern Catholic eparchy in Belthangady, India, under the Syro-Malabar Catholic Church. It was established in 1999 by Pope John Paul II's bull "Cum Ampla". It is a suffragan diocese of the Syro-Malabar Catholic Archeparchy of Tellicherry. The bishop of this diocese is Lawrence Mukkuzhy. This diocese had been established for the Syro-Malabar Christians of three districts in Karnataka, namely Dakshina Kannada, Kodagu and Udupi.

See also 
Roman Catholic Diocese of Mangalore
Roman Catholic Diocese of Udupi
Deanery of Belthangady
Syro-Malankara Catholic Eparchy of Puttur
Most Holy Redeemer Church, Belthangady
Monsignor Ambrose Madtha

References

External links
 Diocese of Belthangady 
 Syro-Malabar Catholic Diocese of Belthangady at Catholic-Hierarchy.org

Belthangady
Archdiocese of Tellicherry
Belthangady
Christian organizations established in 1999
Roman Catholic dioceses and prelatures established in the 20th century
Christianity in Karnataka
1999 establishments in Karnataka